Crystal Chigbu is a Nigerian social entrepreneur and a development consultant. She founded IREDE Foundation after her daughter was born without a shinbone. Her foundation provides prosthetics and other walking aids to children 18 and under. Through her foundation, Crystal has provided over 120 prosthetic limbs  to over 82 children across 17 states in Nigeria.

Education and Career 
She is a graduate of University of Lagos with a Bachelor of Science Degree in Biochemistry. Crystal is a member of the Business and Professional Women of Nigeria, a member of the Nigerian Network of NGOs, and a graduate of the Pan African University's Enterprise Development Centre. She is a graduate of the Acumen fellowship program.

Personal life 
Crystal hails from Epe in Lagos state and married to Zubby Chigbu and they have two children together. Crystal Chigbu's daughter was born without a tibia and a knee cap. As a result, Crystal and her husband labored nonstop to find a solution. Getting their daughter an artificial limb was the smartest idea they'd ever done, and it was from there that the desire to aid other children, particularly those who couldn't afford one, arose.

Crystal and IREDE Foundation 
Crystal founded after working for 12 years as a sales and marketing manager for Procter and Gamble. The IREDE Foundation to advocate for young amputees and children with limb disorders, as well as to work closely with specialists and the community to ensure that they are self-sufficient. The foundation seeks to accomplish this by providing prosthetic and orthodontic devices to underprivileged youngsters (ages 2 to 18). It also encourages children and their parents through support groups and helps them reintegrate into the school system following their recovery. The Foundation started precisely 23 August 2012, but the plan began in June 2012.

Awards and recognition 
Crystal Chigbu has received several awards for her work including the Life Transformation Award from Wise Women Awards., The Ebony Life TV sponsored Sisterhood Award for Philanthropist of the year (2014) and the Naija Diamonds Award (2014) sponsored by Diamond Bank. She has also been nominated for HNWOTY special award.

References

External links

Living people
People from Aba, Abia
People from Lagos State
Nigerian social entrepreneurs
Year of birth missing (living people)
University of Lagos alumni